Megachile inexspectata is a species of bee in the family Megachilidae. It was described by Rebmann in 1968.

References

Inexspectata
Insects described in 1968